Elena Dementieva was the defending champion, but she chose not to participate that year.Timea Bacsinszky won in the final 6–2, 7–5 against Sabine Lisicki.

Seeds

Draw

Finals

Top half

Bottom half

External links
 Main draw
 Qualifying draw

BGL Luxembourg Open
Luxembourg Open
2009 in Luxembourgian tennis